Chentshin  is the name of a Polish Hasidic dynasty founded by the Rebbe Chayim Shmuel Szternfeld. Chentshin is the Yiddish name of Chęciny, a town in present-day Poland.

Rebbe Szternfeld was a great-grandson of the Chozeh of Lublin. He was known for his great love for the Land of Israel and he kept a clock in his house which told local time in the Land of Israel.

The mantle of rebbe was eventually adopted by the Ozherov rebbe, so that Rabbi Moshe Yechiel Halevi Epstein (previous) and Rabbi Tanchum Becker (current) are the rebbes of Ozherov-Chenchin.

Rabbi Moshe Yechiel Epstein's father was a son-in-law of Rebbe Chayim Shmuel of Chentshin.

See also 
 Sarah Horowitz-Sternfeld, the Chentshiner Rebbetzin

References 

Hasidic dynasties of Poland
Hasidic Judaism in Europe
Orthodox Judaism in Poland